is a former Japanese football player.

Club career
Nejime was born in Tokyo on December 22, 1984. He joined Tokyo Verdy from youth team in 2003. Although he played many matches from first season, he could hardly play in the match in 2004 and 2005. The club was also relegated to J2 League end of 2005 season. In 2006, he played many matches and he moved to Yokohama FC in 2007. At Yokohama FC, although he played many matches, his opportunity to play decreased in 2010. He moved to Roasso Kumamoto in 2011 and played until 2012. He moved to India and joined Churchill Brothers in 2013. He retired in 2014.

National team career
In September 2001, Nejime was selected Japan U-17 national team for 2001 U-17 World Championship. He played all 3 matches.

Club statistics

References

External links

1984 births
Living people
Association football people from Tokyo
Japanese footballers
Japan youth international footballers
J1 League players
J2 League players
Tokyo Verdy players
Yokohama FC players
Roasso Kumamoto players
Churchill Brothers FC Goa players
Association football midfielders